Sonia Farrugia (born 3 June 1976) is a Maltese former footballer who played as a goalkeeper. She has been a member of the Malta women's national team.

References

1976 births
Living people
Women's association football goalkeepers
Maltese women's footballers
Malta women's international footballers